KWFM was a classic hits formatted broadcast radio station licensed to South Tucson, Arizona, serving Tucson, Arizona. KWFM was last owned by AM Radio Licenses, LLC.

History
The station went on the air as KMOP in 1957. It became KHYT in 1965, KMRR on February 7, 1987, KJLL in 1999, and KWFM in 2012.

As a talk radio station, KWFM aired national newscasts from CBS Radio and CNN Radio. Hosts included Stephanie Miller, Ed Schultz, Michael Smerconish, Dr. Joy Browne, Leslie Marshall, Thom Hartman, and Don Imus.

As a music station, KWFM featured Rick Dees (Daily Dees, Rick Dees Weekly Top 40) and M.G. Kelly (Back To The 70s, Amazing 80s, Your 90s Rewind.)

In the midst of immense local turmoil and declining revenue as a talk station, KWFM flipped to a music format on September 20, 2012.

The Federal Communications Commission cancelled KWFM's license to broadcast on October 4, 2021 when the owner, AM Radio Licenses, LLC, did not file for renewal.

References

External links
FCC History Cards for KWFM (covering 1956-1980 as KMOP / KHYT)
FCC Station Search Details: DKWFM (Facility ID: 57503)

WFM
Radio stations established in 1957
1957 establishments in Arizona
Radio stations disestablished in 2021
2021 disestablishments in Arizona
Defunct radio stations in the United States
WFM